Warwick Goble (22 November 1862 – 22 January 1943) was a British illustrator of children's books.

He was educated and trained at the City of London School and the Westminster School of Art. He specialized in fairy tales and exotic scenes from Japan, India and Arabia. He illustrated H.G. Wells' The War of the Worlds - among his first published illustrations, soon to be followed by a suite for The Book of Baal. He also provided illustrations for magazines, including Pearson's Magazine, illustrating a number of early science-fiction stories, including several by Frederick  Merrick White.

Selected works 
Books illustrated:
 Samuel Rutherford Crockett, Lad’s Love (Bliss Sands, 1897)
 H. G. Wells, The War of The Worlds (Heinemann, 1898)
 Mrs. Molesworth, The Grim House (Nisbet, 1899)
 Alexander van Millingen, Constantinople (Black, 1906)
 Francis A. Gasquet,  The Greater Abbeys of England (Chatto, 1908)
 Jane Barlow, Irish Ways (Allen, 1909)
 Charles Kingsley, The Water Babies (MacMillan, 1909)
 Grace James, Green Willow and Other Japanese Fairy Tales (MacMillan, 1910)
 Giambattista Basile, Stories from the Pentamerone (MacMillan, 1911)
 The Modern Reader’s Chaucer (MacMillan, 1912)
 Lal Behari Dey, Folk-Tales of Bengal (MacMillan, 1912)
 Dinah Craik, The Fairy Book (MacMillan, 1913)
 D. A. MacKenzie, Indian Myth and Legend (Gresham, 1913)
 Dinah Craik, John Halifax, Gentleman (OUP, 1914)
 Cornelia Sorabji, Indian Tales of The Great Ones (1916)
 J. S. Fletcher, The Cistercians in Yorkshire (SPCK, 1919)
 W. G. Stables, Young Peggy McQueen (Collins)
 D. Owen, The Book of Fairy Poetry (Longmans, 1920)
 Robert Louis Stevenson, Treasure Island (MacMillan, 1923)
 Robert Louis Stevenson, Kidnapped (MacMillan, 1925)
 Washington Irving, Tales of the Alhambra (MacMillan, 1926)
 Elinor Whitney Field, Tod of the Fens (Macmillan, 1928)

Goble contributed to these and other periodical publications.
 The Boy's Own Paper
 The Captain – for boys
 The Illustrated London News
 Little Folks – for children
 The Minister
 The Pall Mall Gazette
 Pearson’s Magazine
 The Strand Magazine
 The Westminster Gazette
 The Wide World Magazine 
 Windsor Magazine

References

External links

 
 
 

 

1862 births
1943 deaths
British illustrators
British speculative fiction artists
Fantasy artists
20th-century illustrators of fairy tales
People of the Victorian era
Science fiction artists
People from Dalston
People from the London Borough of Hackney